{{DISPLAYTITLE:C9H19NO2}}
The molecular formula C9H19NO2 (molar mass: 173.25 g/mol, exact mass: 173.1416 u) may refer to:

 Imagabalin
 4-Methylpregabalin